Jacob Haight (March 4, 1775 or 1776 – c. 1860 Catskill, Greene County, New York) was an American politician.

Life
He was a member of the New York State Senate from 1824 to 1827. In 1828, he was among the incorporators of the Catskill and Ithaca Railroad which was never built. He was New York State Treasurer from 1839 to 1842.

Sources
Political Graveyard
The New York Civil List compiled by Franklin Benjamin Hough (pages 35 and 141; Weed, Parsons and Co., 1858) (Google Books)
Early railroads, at Catskill Archive
A Genealogical History of the Hoyt, Haight, and Hight Families by David Webster Hoyt (Printed for the author by the Providence Press Co., 1871; page 606)

1770s births
1860s deaths
New York (state) Whigs
19th-century American politicians
New York (state) state senators
New York State Treasurers
19th-century American railroad executives